Minchinabad Tehsil , is a tehsil located in Bahawalnagar District, Punjab, Pakistan. The city of Minchinabad is the headquarters of the tehsil which is administratively subdivided into 25 Union Councils.

Mandi Sadiq Gunj TC and Mcload Gunj TC, these smaller cities are also included in Tehsil Minchin Abad.

A canal named Head Ford Wah passes through Minchin Abad city and worth seeing is suspended bridge built on this canal during British Rule in Subcontinent.

The notables in Minchin Abad Tehsil are: Mian Abdul Ghaffar Wattoo MNA, Syed Asghar Shah, Shoukat Ali Laleka and Mian Fida Hussain Wattoo.

Geography

Minchinabad Tehsil has an area of 1,818 km2.

Adjacent tehsils
Depalpur Tehsil, Okara District (north)
Fazilka Tehsil, Fazilka District, Punjab, India (northeast)
Sri Ganganagar Tehsil, Sri Ganganagar District, Rajasthan, India (south)
Karanpur Tehsil, Sri Ganganagar District, Rajasthan, India (southwest)
Bahawalnagar Tehsil (southwest)
Pakpattan Tehsil, Pakpattan District (northwest)

Demographics

According to the 2017 Census of Pakistan, there are 526,428 people living in Minchinabad Tehsil and 83,173 households. Its population recorded in the 1998 census was 354,261.

References

External links

Bahawalnagar District
Tehsils of Punjab, Pakistan